Vasalemma Parish was a rural municipality in north-western Estonia. It was a part of Harju County. The municipality had a population of 4,991 (as of 1 January 2012) and covers an area of 38.66 km2. The population density was 129.1 inhabitants per km2.

Vasalemma Parish consisted of 3 small boroughs (Vasalemma, Rummu, Ämari) and 2 villages (Veskiküla and Lemmaru).

The mayor was Mart Mets.

Gallery

See also
Ämari Air Base
Murru Prison
Rummu Prison
Rummu quarry

References

External links
Official website (available only in Estonian)